Joseph Robert Harvey (born January 9, 1992) is an American professional baseball pitcher in the Atlanta Braves organization. He has played in Major League Baseball for the New York Yankees and the Colorado Rockies.

Career

Amateur
Harvey attended La Salle College High School and Kennedy-Kenrick Catholic High School. He graduated from Kennedy-Kenrick in 2010, and then enrolled at the University of Pittsburgh, where he played college baseball for the Pittsburgh Panthers. In 2013, he played collegiate summer baseball with the Hyannis Harbor Hawks of the Cape Cod Baseball League. In 2014, his junior year, he went 2–2 with a 2.90 ERA in 15 games (12 starts). After the season, the New York Yankees selected him in the 19th round, with the 572nd overall selection, of the 2014 MLB draft.

New York Yankees
Harvey signed and made his professional debut in 2014 with the Rookie-level GCL Yankees and the Class A Short Season Staten Island Yankees, accumulating a 0–2 win–loss record with a 1.74 earned run average (ERA) in  innings pitched. He spent the 2015 season with the Class A Charleston RiverDogs, going 1–1 with a 4.24 ERA in 17 innings. His 2016 season was again split between the GCL Yankees and the Staten Island Yankees, accumulating a 0–1 with a 0.84 ERA in 20 innings. In 2017, he played for the Class A-Advanced Tampa Yankees, going 1–0 with a 1.05 ERA in 25.2 innings. He split the 2018 season between the Double-A Trenton Thunder and the Triple-A Scranton/Wilkes-Barre RailRiders, accumulating a 3–2 record with a 1.67 ERA in 59 innings. 

The Yankees added Harvey to their 40-man roster after the 2018 season. He opened the 2019 season back with Scranton/Wilkes-Barre. The Yankees promoted him to the major leagues on April 10, 2019, and he made his MLB debut that day. He recorded three strikeouts over two scoreless innings of relief.

Colorado Rockies
On July 31, 2019, the Yankees traded Harvey to the Colorado Rockies for minor leaguer Alfredo Garcia. On December 9, 2019, he was designated for assignment and was outrighted to Triple-A on December 16. He had his contract purchased on August 2, 2020. On October 29, 2020, Harvey was outrighted off of the 40-man roster. He became a free agent on November 2, 2020. On December 11, 2020, Harvey re-signed with the Rockies organization on a minor league contract. On June 20, 2021, Harvey was selected to the active roster. He was designated for assignment by Colorado on June 22 without making an appearance for the team. He was outrighted to the Triple-A Albuquerque Isotopes on June 25, but elected free agency on June 27, 2021.

Minnesota Twins
On July 2, 2021, Harvey signed a minor league contract with the Minnesota Twins organization and was assigned to the Triple-A St. Paul Saints. Harvey pitched an 18.00 ERA in four games for St. Paul and elected minor league free agency following the season on November 7.

Atlanta Braves
On February 23, 2023, Harvey signed a minor league contract with the Atlanta Braves organization.

References

External links

1992 births
Living people
Albuquerque Isotopes players
Baseball players from Pennsylvania
Charleston RiverDogs players
Gulf Coast Yankees players
Hyannis Harbor Hawks players
Major League Baseball pitchers
New York Yankees players
Colorado Rockies players
People from Montgomery County, Pennsylvania
Pittsburgh Panthers baseball players
Scranton/Wilkes-Barre RailRiders players
Staten Island Yankees players
Sportspeople from Montgomery County, Pennsylvania
St. Paul Saints players
Tampa Yankees players
Toros del Este players
American expatriate baseball players in the Dominican Republic
Trenton Thunder players